Kevin O'Dwyer (born 1973 in Skibbereen, County Cork) is an Irish former Gaelic footballer. He played for his local club O'Donovan Rossa and was a member of the Cork senior inter-county team from 1995 until 2005.

References

1973 births
Living people
Cork inter-county Gaelic footballers
Gaelic football goalkeepers
Garda Síochána officers
Munster inter-provincial Gaelic footballers
O'Donovan Rossa (Cork) Gaelic footballers